Maruti Hospital is a multi-speciality hospital located in Tiruchirappalli, Tamil Nadu, India. It was established in 1997, and offers emergency care, general medicine, interventional radiology, nephrology and andrology, neuroscience, plastic surgery, cosmetology, pulmonology, obstetrics and gynecology, cardiology, orthopedics, paediatrics and neonatology, surgical gastroenterology and ENT.

References

Hospitals in Tiruchirappalli
1997 establishments in Tamil Nadu
Hospitals established in 1997